"Your Love Keeps Working on Me" is a song performed by the song's co-writer, Joey Diggs, and appeared on the soundtrack to the film, Bébé's Kids.

History
It was covered by Jody Watley and released as the first single from her fourth album, Intimacy. "Your Love Keeps Working on Me" reached number 26 on the Billboard Hot R&B Singles chart, and was a number two dance hit on the Billboard Hot Dance Club Play chart.

Charts

References

Jody Watley songs
1993 singles
1992 songs
MCA Records singles
New jack swing songs